Shane Allen Minor (born May 3, 1968) is an American country music artist. Signed to Mercury Nashville Records in 1999, Minor released his self-titled album that year, and it produced three hit singles on the Billboard Hot Country Singles & Tracks charts. Although he was dropped from Mercury's roster in 2000, he has continued to write songs for other artists, including the No. 1 singles "Beautiful Mess" by Diamond Rio, "Brand New Girlfriend" by Steve Holy, and "Live a Little" by Kenny Chesney.

Career
Before his recording career began, Minor was a police officer in the Los Angeles Police Department, as well as a rodeo bull rider. After leaving the police force in 1994, Minor became a singer, working small gigs throughout California, eventually recording a demo tape which was sent to producer Dann Huff.

Shane was signed to Mercury Nashville Records in 1999. His debut single, "Slave to the Habit" (co-written by Kostas, Toby Keith, and Chuck Cannon), reached number 20 on the Billboard Hot Country Singles & Tracks charts that same year. In addition, he was signed as an opening act for country pop singer Shania Twain. The album also produced the top 30 hit "Ordinary Love" and "I Think You're Beautiful". Despite the success of its first two singles, however, the album did not chart on Top Country Albums at all.

Minor left Mercury Nashville in 2000, and has not recorded any albums since. In the 2000s, he found success as a songwriter when Diamond Rio reached number 1 in 2002 with "Beautiful Mess". Minor also co-wrote several hits for other artists, including "You're in My Head" by Brian McComas, "She Thinks She Needs Me" by Andy Griggs, "Brand New Girlfriend" by Steve Holy, "International Harvester" by Craig Morgan, "Fall" by Clay Walker (which was also released by Kimberley Locke), "Keep in Mind" and "Here Comes Summer" by LoCash Cowboys, "Hell Yes I Like Beer" by Kevin Fowler, "Playing the Part" and "I Remember You" by Jamey Johnson, "His Kind of Money (My Kind of Love)" by Eric Church, "Live a Little" by Kenny Chesney, "Close Your Eyes" by Parmalee, and "Chillin' It" by Cole Swindell. Minor has penned songs for Luke Bryan, Justin Moore, Chris Young, Trace Adkins, and Rodney Atkins.

Discography

Studio albums

Singles

Music videos

References

1968 births
American country singer-songwriters
Living people
Los Angeles Police Department officers
Mercury Records artists
Country musicians from California
Musicians from Modesto, California